Agamura kermanensis is a species of gecko found in Iran.

References

kermanensis
Reptiles of Iran
Endemic fauna of Iran
Reptiles described in 2018